Andre Frolov (born 18 April 1988) is an Estonian professional footballer who plays as a midfielder for Estonian Meistriliiga club Paide Linnameeskond.

Club career

Flora
Frolov started playing football with Flora's youth academy. He spent several years playing for various reserve and feeder teams affiliated with Flora, before becoming a regular with the main team. He won his first Meistriliiga title with Flora in the 2010 season, and his second one in the 2011 season, having scored 3 goals. He went on to score another 10 goals in the following 2012 Meistriliiga season and becoming an integral part of the first team as Flora finished in third place. On 19 October 2012, Frolov was appointed as Flora captain for the remainder of season. In the 2015 season, Frolov won his third Meistriliiga title.

Paide Linnameeskond
On 29 December 2016, Frolov signed a two-year contract with Paide Linnameeskond.

International career
Frolov made his international debut for Estonia on 8 November 2012 against Oman, coming off the bench during the 74th minute as a substitute for Ats Purje. On the 88th minute he delivered a corner kick which took a deflection off Taavi Rähn before being headed into the net by Flora teammate Gert Kams.

Honours

Club
Flora
 Meistriliiga: 2010, 2011, 2015
 Estonian Cup: 2010–11, 2012–13
 Estonian Supercup: 2011, 2012, 2014

References

External links

1988 births
Living people
Estonian footballers
Estonia international footballers
People from Hiiumaa Parish
Estonian people of Russian descent
FC Flora players
Viljandi JK Tulevik players
FC Warrior Valga players
Paide Linnameeskond players
Association football midfielders
JK Tervis Pärnu players
Estonia youth international footballers
Estonia under-21 international footballers